Yesha Rughani is an Indian actress. She rose to fame starring as the titular character in Star Bharat's Muskaan. Rughani is known for portraying Devi/Devika in Jeet Gayi Toh Piya Morey and Zara in Hero – Gayab Mode On. Currently, she is starring as the female lead in Kabhi Kabhie Ittefaq Sey as Riddhima "Gungun" Bhatnagar.

Early life
Before pursuing her career in acting, Rughani worked as a stylist for Priyanka Chopra, Esha Gupta, Malaika Arora among others.

Career
In 2017, Rughani made her television debut with Jeet Gayi Toh Piya Morey opposite Krip Suri. She got praise for her dual roles as mother and daughter, and was extremely well received.

After that from May 2018, she played the titular character of a young woman who was ostracized by society due to her mother's profession in Muskaan, a role for which she earned critical acclaim and huge fan base. 

In 2020, she started starring as Zara in Sony SAB's fantasy series Hero Gayab Mode On opposite Abhishek Nigam.

Since January 2022, Rughani has been playing Gungun in StarPlus's Kabhi Kabhie Ittefaq Sey opposite Manan Joshi.

Filmography

Television

Music videos

References

External links

Living people
1992 births
Indian television actresses
Actresses in Hindi television
Actresses from Gujarat
21st-century Indian actresses